Angelo D'Alessandro (1926–2011) was an Italian screenwriter and film director who worked on feature films and television. He worked as assistant director on Federico Fellini's Variety Lights (1950).

Abridged filmography
 At the Edge of the City (1953, Writer)
 I piaceri dello scapolo (1960, Writer)
 Hands over the City (1963) - Balsamo
 Turi and the Paladins (1977, Director)

References

Bibliography 
 Brunetta, Gian Piero. The History of Italian Cinema: A Guide to Italian Film from Its Origins to the Twenty-first Century.  Princeton University Press, 2009.

External links 
 
 

1926 births
2011 deaths
People from Putignano
Italian screenwriters
Italian film directors
Italian male screenwriters